Liebenthal is a hamlet in Saskatchewan. The community consists of the Sacred Heart Catholic Church and the Liebenthal community hall. It is considered as the southern (and alternative) gateway to the Great Sandhills Ecological Area. Following Township Road 200, a gravel road also known as Great Sandhills Route, east from the intersection of highways 21 (north-south) and 321 (east-west) takes visitors to the heart of the dunefield. After a distance of 18 km (11 mi) the gravel road meets Range Road 3244 coming from the south. It is here that a 90° left-turn runs north into the Sandhills.

Unincorporated communities in Saskatchewan
Happyland No. 231, Saskatchewan